The 1933 Catholic University Cardinals football team was an American football team that represented the Catholic University of America as an independent during the 1933 college football season. In its fourth year under head coach Dutch Bergman, the team compiled a 6–3 record and outscored opponents by a total of 193 to 65.

Schedule

References

Catholic University
Catholic University Cardinals football seasons
Catholic University Cardinals football